In the 1846 Iowa State Senate elections, Iowa voters elected state senators to serve in the first Iowa General Assembly. Elections were held for all 19 members of the State Senate. In the newly created Senate, members were to serve four-year terms. Members of the first General Assembly were classified into two groups. Nine of the newly elected senators would serve full four-year terms, while 10 drew short terms of two years and were up for re-election in 1848. This classification process began the rotation system whereby half the members of the Senate are elected biennially for full four-year terms.

This was the first general election following Iowa's admission to the Union. Prior to statehood, the Iowa Territory had a Legislative Assembly consisting of an upper chamber (i.e., the Territory Council) and a lower chamber (i.e., the Territory House). Therefore, the Territory Council was the predecessor of the Iowa Senate, which became the upper chamber in the new Iowa General Assembly.

In the previous election in 1845, the members of the eighth and final Territory Council were chosen. Democrats held a majority of seats with 11 to Whigs' two seats in the final Territory Council. The newly created Iowa Senate was expanded to nineteen members and districts were redrawn in advance of the election.

To claim a majority of seats, the Whigs needed to net eight seats.

The general election took place in 1846.

Democrats maintained a majority of seats. Following the 1846 general election, Democrats held 11 seats in the Iowa Senate while Whigs held eight seats (a net gain of 6 seats for Whigs). Democratic Councilor Stephen Hempstead was the President of the eighth & final Territory Council. Democratic Senator Thomas Baker was chosen as the first President of the Iowa Senate. During the first General Assembly, Democratic Senator Thomas Hughes succeeded Senator Baker as the second President of the Iowa Senate.

Summary of Results 

Source:

Detailed Results
NOTE: The Iowa General Assembly does not contain detailed vote totals for Iowa State Senate elections in 1846.

See also
 Elections in Iowa

External links
District boundaries for the Iowa Territory Council in 1845:
Iowa Territory Council Districts 1845-1846 map
District boundaries were redrawn before the 1846 general election for the Iowa Senate:
Iowa Senate Districts 1846-1849 map

References

Iowa Senate
Iowa
Iowa Senate elections